Tumble (originally Let's Get Ready to Tumble) is a British television show, featuring celebrities taking part in gymnastics to win the votes of the public. Learning sessions were given on the basics of gymnastics to the celebrities taking part. The show was backed by British Gymnastics. The trainers were the same ones who trained Louis Smith and Beth Tweddle. The show was broadcast live over six episodes on BBC One, starting on 9 August 2014.

The series was hosted by Alex Jones. The judges were Nadia Comăneci, Louis Smith, Craig Heap and Sebastien Stella.
On occasions the judges would perform a routine.

On 14 November 2014, BBC One cancelled the show after only one series.

Production
The television show was commissioned by Charlotte Moore and Mark Lindsay. Katie Taylor, the controller of BBC entertainment and events, said: "One thing’s for certain, you can expect the celebs to be pushed out of their comfort zone in what is probably the most physically demanding show of its kind anywhere in the world." BBC Worldwide has invested in the series. Charlotte Moore said: "Let's Get Ready to Tumble will see brave celebrity contestants sign up to the toughest live Saturday night TV challenge yet!"

Couples
The celebrities taking part were announced on 13 June 2014. On 25 July, it was announced that fitness instructor & motivational speaker Mr Motivator had withdrawn from the programme after dislocating his knee, necessitating surgery. His professional partner Kerry Scotts withdrew as well. On 28 July, it was confirmed that screen actor Peter Duncan was to replace Mr Motivator in the competition with his partner Kate McWilliam.

Scoring chart

 indicates the couple eliminated that week
 indicates the couple were in the bottom two but not eliminated
 indicates the couple were eliminated immediately (no bottom two)
 indicates the winning couple
 indicates the runner-up couples
Green scores indicate the highest score for that week
Red scores indicate the lowest score for that week
"—" indicates the couple(s) that did not perform that week

Average chart
This table only counts for performances scored on a traditional 40-point scale.

Highest and lowest scoring performances of the series 
The best and worst performances in each discipline according to the judges' 40-points scale are as follows:

Weekly scores and songs

Week 1 (9 August)
Special guest: Louis Smith

Week 2 (16 August)
Special guest: Beth Tweddle

Week 3 (23 August)
Special musical guest: The Saturdays - "Up"/"Higher"/"All Fired Up"/"Ego"/"What About Us"

Week 4 (30 August)
Special guest: Circulus

Week 5 (6 September)
Special guest: Sebastien Stella

Week 6: Final (13 September)

Ratings
All ratings are taken from BARB.

See also
 Strictly Come Dancing, which follows a similar format but for dancing instead of gymnastics
 Dancing on Ice, which follows a similar format but for ice skating instead of gymnastics
 Splash!, which follows a similar format but for diving instead of gymnastics
 The Jump, which follows a similar format but for winter sports instead of gymnastics

References

External links
 

2014 British television series debuts
2014 British television series endings
BBC Television shows
English-language television shows
Gymnastics competitions
Television shows shot at Elstree Film Studios